Westmorland Motorway Services Limited is the British holding company that owns Westmorland Limited who run three motorway service stations plus a truckstop close to the M6 motorway and a combined service and visitor/exhibition  centre.

The company is marketed as "The Westmorland Family" and its head office is located at the northbound Tebay services in Cumbria.

The company was formed in the early 1970s to operate the northbound Tebay West services on the M6 at the time this was the only MSA in the UK that was not part of a chain. Originally the company was a partnership between the Dunning and Birkett families though the Dunnings later bought out the other shareholders.

The company's sites are –

 Gloucester – M5 between J11a and J12
 Cairn Lodge (Happendon) – M74 J11 and J12 via B7078
 J38 Truckstop – M6 J38
 Rheged Centre  – A66, A592 roundabout
 Tebay – M6 between J38 and J39

References

Service companies of England
Motorway service areas (United Kingdom)
Companies based in Cumbria